Bueler or Bueller may refer to:

 Tim Bueler, founder of the High School Conservative Clubs of America
 Ferris Bueller, a fictional character in the 1986 movie Ferris Bueller's Day Off
 Ferris Bueller (TV series)
 Bueller, the developmental code name for the Amazon Fire TV

See also 
 Buehler (disambiguation)
 Buhler (disambiguation)